Stacey Marinkovich (born 25 February 1981), previously known as Stacey Rosman, is a former Australian netball player and current netball coach. During the Commonwealth Bank Trophy era she played for Queensland Firebirds and Perth Orioles. In the ANZ Championship era she played for West Coast Fever. She captained both Orioles and Fever. After retiring as a player, Rosman became a coach. In 2014 she was appointed head coach of West Coast Fever. In 2018 she guided Fever to their first ever grand final. She was subsequently named Joyce Brown Coach of the Year. In 2020 Rosman, now Marinkovich, was appointed head coach of the Australia national netball team.

Early life and family
Rosman is originally from Queensland and was raised in South Brisbane. She is the oldest of four siblings and has two sisters and a brother. She is married to Lindsay Marinkovich and has one son, Matthew, born in December 2019.

Playing career

AIS
During the 1999 season, Rosman played for the Australian Institute of Sport. She was coached by Norma Plummer and her team mates included Demelza Fellowes and Cynna Neele.

Queensland Firebirds
Between 2000 and 2001, Rosman made 18 appearances for Queensland Firebirds in the Commonwealth Bank Trophy.

Perth Orioles
Between 2002 and 2007, Rosman made 71 appearances for Perth Orioles in the Commonwealth Bank Trophy. She captained Orioles during the 2006 and 2007 seasons. Her Orioles team mates included Caitlin Bassett, Kate Beveridge, Susan Fuhrmann, Jessica Shynn and Larrissa Willcox.

West Coast Fever
During the 2008 and 2009 ANZ Championship seasons, Rosman played for West Coast Fever. Rosman captained Fever during the 2008 season. During the 2008 season she also made her 100th Commonwealth Bank Trophy/ANZ Championship appearance. She retired as a player at the end of the 2009 season.

Coaching career

Western Sting
During the 2013 and 2014 seasons, Rosman served as head coach of Western Sting in the Australian Netball League. During the 2014 season she guided them to third place in the league.

West Coast Fever
During the 2012 and 2013 ANZ Championship seasons, Rosman served an assistant coach to Norma Plummer at West Coast Fever. In 2014 she succeeded Plummer as the Fever head coach. In 2015 Rosman guided Fever to   third place in the Australian Conference. She was subsequently named as the head coach in the 2015 ANZ Championship All-Star Team. In August 2016 she signed a new four-year deal to remain as Fever coach. During the 2018 Suncorp Super Netball season Rosman, now Marinkovich, guided Fever to their first ever grand final. She was subsequently named Joyce Brown Coach of the Year.

Australia
In August 2020 Marinkovich was appointed head coach of the Australia national netball team, succeeding Lisa Alexander. Marinkovich has previously worked as a coach with the national team in various capacities, including coaching the Australian Fast5 Flyers team at the 2017 Fast5 Netball World Series.

Honours

Head coach
West Coast Fever
Suncorp Super Netball
Runners Up: 2018, 2020

Individual awards

References

1981 births
Living people
Australian netball players
Netball players from Queensland
Australian Institute of Sport netball players
Queensland Firebirds players
Perth Orioles players
West Coast Fever players
ANZ Championship players
Australian netball coaches
West Coast Fever coaches
Suncorp Super Netball coaches
Australian Netball League coaches
Australia national netball team coaches
ANZ Championship coaches